Pirakuh Rural District is a rural district (dehestan) in the Central District of Jowayin County, Razavi Khorasan Province, Iran. At the 2006 census, its population was 5,377, in 1,732 families.  The rural district has 16 villages.

References 

Rural Districts of Razavi Khorasan Province
Joveyn County